The Annual Review of Law and Social Science is a peer-reviewed academic journal that publishes an annual volume of review articles relevant to the interconnection of law, culture, social structure, and society. It was established in 2005 and is published by Annual Reviews. Its current editor is  Valerie P. Hans.

History
The Annual Review of Law and Social Science was first published in 2005 by nonprofit publisher Annual Reviews. Its inaugural editor was John L. Hagan. As of 2021, it is published both in print and electronically.
He was followed by  Robert J. MacCoun (2018-2021). MacCoun was succeeded by Valerie P. Hans, who is listed as editor as of the 2022 issue.

Scope and indexing
The Annual Review of Law and Social Science defines its scope as covering significant developments in the field of law. Its reviews examine the interconnections of law, culture, social structure, and society. Most volumes include a prefatory chapter in which a prominent scholar in the field reflects on their careers and experiences. As of 2022, Journal Citation Reports lists the journal's 2021 impact factor as 2.351, ranking it as 33rd out of 154 journal titles in the category "Law" and 70thj of 148 titles in "Sociology".  It is abstracted and indexed in Scopus, Social Sciences Citation Index, IBZ Online, Criminal Justice Abstracts, Political Science Complete, and Academic Search, among others.

Editorial processes
The Annual Review of Law and Social Science is helmed by the editor or the co-editors. The editor is assisted by the editorial committee, which includes associate editors, regular members, and occasionally guest editors. Guest members participate at the invitation of the editor, and serve terms of one year. All other members of the editorial committee are appointed by the Annual Reviews board of directors and serve five-year terms. The editorial committee determines which topics should be included in each volume and solicits reviews from qualified authors. Unsolicited manuscripts are not accepted. Peer review of accepted manuscripts is undertaken by the editorial committee.

List of editors
 John L. Hagan (2005–2018)
 Robert J. MacCoun (2018–2021)
 Valerie P. Hans (2022-)

Current editorial board
As of 2022, the editorial committee consists of the editor and the following members:

 Carol A. Heimer
 Michael W. McCann
 Gillian K. Hadfield
 Martin Krygier
 Robert J. MacCoun
 Osagie Obasogie 
 Arzoo Osanloo 
 Jennifer Robbennolt
 César A. Rodríguez-Garavito

References 

 

Law and Social Science
Annual journals
Publications established in 2005
English-language journals
American law journals
Sociology journals